Etowah High School (EHS) is a public high school in Attalla, Alabama, United States. It is part of the Attalla City Schools district.

In 1959 the school had 43 teachers for 1,266 students, a situation Mrs. Clark Mynatt of the Etowah News-Journal described as a "bad situation of overcrowding".

In 2019 drama was added to the fine arts subjects while computer science and robotics were added to the STEM subjects.

Notable alumni 

 Cadillac Williams, football player
 Patrick Nix, football coach
 Freddie Kitchens, football coach
 Tyrone Nix, football coach
 Roy Moore, politician and jurist
 Derrick Nix, football coach

References

External links 
 

Public high schools in Alabama
Schools in Etowah County, Alabama